The 1965 season of the Venezuelan Primera División, the top category of Venezuelan football, was played by 8 teams. The national champions were Lara.

Results

Standings

External links
Venezuela 1965 season at RSSSF

Ven
Venezuelan Primera División seasons
1965 in Venezuelan sport